Aleksandr Ilyich Ulyanov (– ) was a Russian revolutionary and political activist. He was the elder brother of Vladimir Lenin, the founder of the Soviet Union.

Early life 
Ulyanov was born in Nizhny Novgorod, the second child and eldest son of schoolteachers Ilya Nikolayevich Ulyanov and Maria Alexandrovna Ulyanova. He was often referred to as Sasha, a common diminutive form of the name Aleksandr. He graduated with honors from the Classical Gymnasium of Simbirsk in 1883 and later attended Saint Petersburg Imperial University, where he majored in Natural Sciences and earned a degree in zoology. While at university, he participated in illegal meetings and demonstrations, often handing out pamphlets and making speeches to students and workers.

Revolutionary 
In 1886 he became a member of the "terrorist faction", which was part of the Narodnaya Volya (People's Will) party. He was one of the authors of the party's program. Acknowledging the working class as the "nucleus of the Socialist Party", the program affirmed the revolutionary's initiative of fighting autocracy through terrorism.

Attempted assassination of Alexander III
Ulyanov and his comrades conspired to assassinate Alexander III of Russia. On 1 March 1887 (Julian calendar), the day of the sixth anniversary of Alexander II's murder, three party members were arrested in the Nevsky Prospekt carrying handmade bombs filled with dynamite and lead pellets poisoned with strychnine. Police suspected that when Alexander III visited church on the anniversary of his father's assassination, the plotters would throw bombs into the Emperor's carriage. The attempt is known as "The Second First of March".

Ulyanov, who served as both the main ideologist of the group as well as the bomb-maker, was later arrested. In court Ulyanov gave a political speech. The conspirators were initially sentenced to death; all but five were then pardoned by Alexander III. Ulyanov was not among those pardoned. On 8 May, he and his four comrades – Pakhomy Andreyushkin, Vasily Generalov, Vasili Osipanov, and Petr Shevyrev – were hanged at Shlisselburg.

Aleksandr's execution drove his younger brother Vladimir Ilyich Ulyanov (Vladimir Lenin) to pursue the Russian revolutionary struggle ever more fervently. Vladimir was already active in politics prior to his older brother's arrest. Vladimir admired his older brother; however, he was quite dismissive of his older brother's political attitude. He once said, "No, my brother won't make a revolutionary, I thought at the time. A revolutionary can't give so much time to the study of worms."  Lenin also remembered how his family were shunned by liberal circles in Simbirsk following his brother's arrest.

Legacy
A minor planet, 2112 Ulyanov, was discovered in 1972 by Soviet astronomer Tamara Mikhailovna Smirnova and named after him.

References 

1866 births
1887 deaths
People from Nizhny Novgorod Governorate
Narodnaya Volya
Executed revolutionaries
People executed by the Russian Empire by hanging
Russian revolutionaries
Russian people of Jewish descent
Family of Vladimir Lenin
Executed Russian people
People executed for attempted murder
19th-century executions by the Russian Empire
Executed people from Nizhny Novgorod Oblast
Russian untitled nobility
People from Ulyanovsk
Prisoners of Shlisselburg fortress
Prisoners of the Peter and Paul Fortress